Sanjeev Singh (born 18 November 1965) is an Indian archer. He competed in the men's individual and team events at the 1988 Summer Olympics.

References

External links
 

1965 births
Living people
Indian male archers
Olympic archers of India
Archers at the 1988 Summer Olympics
Sportspeople from Patna